Fabula AI is a Artificial intelligence company founded in 2018 that pioneered the creation of geometric deep learning, and used it to tackle the dissemination of 'fake news', tracking how content spread on social networks rather than focusing on the content itself. Founded by Michael Bronstein, Ernesto Schmitt, Federico Monti and Damon Mannion, Fabula was acquired by Twitter in 2020, to help with their fight against misinformation.

Early History
Fabula was co-founded on 20 April 2018 by Imperial College Professor Michael Bronstein, PhD student Federico Monti, entrepreneur Ernesto Schmitt and Damon Mannion. Bronstein was chair in machine learning & pattern recognition at Imperial College, London at the time, while Monti was at the University of Lugano, Switzerland. Later that year, the company raised an undisclosed sum from various individual angel investors.

The company was founded to solve the problem of online disinformation, or "Fake news" by looking at how it spreads on social networks rather than focusing on the content itself, as some other approaches take. It achieved this through its use of patented algorithms that use the emergent field of "Geometric Deep Learning" to detect online disinformation, employing geometric graph deep learning to detect network manipulation.

By February 2019, Fabula AI was "able to identify 93 percent of ‘fake news’ within hours of dissemination". This 93% accuracy was achieved within a few hours of the news first appearing.

Twitter Acquisition

On 3 June 2019, Twitter announced its acquisition of Fabula AI for an undisclosed sum, likely to tackle disinformation it was receiving increasing political pressure for.

References

Twitter, Inc. acquisitions
Companies based in London
British companies established in 2018
2019 mergers and acquisitions